Hathua is a census town in Gopalganj district in the Indian states of Bihar.

Geography 

Demographics 
As of the 2011 Census of India, Hathua town had a population of 7,156, of which 3,653 are males while 3,503 are females. Population within the age group of 0 to 6 years was 1,238 which is 17.30% of total population of Hathua town. Hathua had an average literacy rate of 61.5% with male literacy of 55.96% and female literacy was 44.04%.

References 

Cities and towns in Gopalganj district, India